Park Dae-han (born 1 May 1991) is a South Korean footballer who plays as full-back for Gimpo FC.

Career
Park Dae-han joined K League 2 side Gangwon FC after the trial in February 2014.

References

External links 

1991 births
Living people
Association football fullbacks
South Korean footballers
Gangwon FC players
Incheon United FC players
Jeonnam Dragons players
Gimcheon Sangmu FC players
FC Anyang players
K League 1 players
K League 2 players
Sungkyunkwan University alumni